Stanley Carter is the name of:
 Stanley B. Carter (1853–1888), lawyer and politician
 Stanley Carter, a fictional character in Marvel Comics also known as Sin-Eater
 Stanley Carter (composer), pen name of Frederick J. Redcliffe, who composed the music for "She Was Bred in Old Kentucky" and other songs during the 1890s
 Stan Carter, a fictional character from the soap opera EastEnders

See also
Carter Stanley